The 2019–20 season was the tenth in the history of Melbourne City Football Club. In addition to the domestic league, Melbourne City competed in the Australia Cup for the sixth time.

The club appointed Erick Mombaerts to the vacant managerial role at the start of the season. On 24 March 2020, the FFA announced that the 2019–20 A-League season would be postponed until further notice due to the COVID-19 pandemic in Australia and New Zealand, and subsequently extended indefinitely. The season resumed on 17 July 2020.

In the 2019–20 season, Melbourne City qualified for though lost both the FFA Cup Final and A-League Grand Final, the latter being the first time it had qualified for a Grand Final. It finished the season in its highest ever place of second position, and in doing so qualified for a maiden AFC Champions League spot in 2021.

Review

Pre-season

Melbourne City finished fifth in the previous season before being eliminated by Adelaide United by a single goal. Before the season started, Warren Joyce left the role as manager to join the Salford City development squad. The club appointed Erick Mombaerts as new manager on 27 June 2019. In the transfer market, they lost Dylan Pierias and Joshua Cavallo to the newest A-League club, Western United. After signing Scott Galloway from Adelaide United, Denis Genreau and Dean Bouzanis returned to the squad from their loan at Dutch club PEC Zwolle.

Players

Squad information

Transfers

Transfers in

Transfers out

From youth squad

Contract extensions

Technical staff

Pre-season and friendlies

Competitions

Overall record

A-League

League table

Results summary

Results by round

Matches

Finals series

FFA Cup

As an A-League team, Melbourne City automatically qualified through to the Round of 32 as one of the ten A-League clubs competing in the competition. In the opening round they took on South Australian side Campbelltown City who won the previous years National Premier Leagues title.

Statistics

Appearances and goals
Includes all competitions. Players with no appearances not included in the list.

Disciplinary record
Includes all competitions. The list is sorted by squad number when total cards are equal. Players with no cards not included in the list.

Clean sheets

References

Melbourne City FC seasons
2019–20 A-League season by team